Genkaku may refer to:

Genkaku (go player), one of the heads of the Inoue go house
Genkaku, a minor character from the game Suikoden II